Sybil (or Sibbell) Ludington (April 5, 1761 – February 26, 1839) is recognized as a heroine of the American Revolutionary War; the accuracy of these accounts is questioned by modern scholars. On April 26, 1777, the 16-year-old daughter of a colonel in the Colonial militia, Henry Ludington, is said to have made an all-night horseback ride  to rally militia forces in neighboring towns after the burning of Danbury, Connecticut by British forces.  

Accounts of Ludington's ride are based on a brief mention in 1907 memoirs about her father, published privately by his grandchildren. A 2015 report in The New England Quarterly says there is little evidence backing the story; whether the ride occurred has been questioned since at least 1956.

Relatively unknown through the 1870s, Ludington became widely recognized around the time of World War II, after historic roadmarkers were placed in locations she was speculated to have visited on her ride. Memorial statues honor her, and books have been written about her. She was honored on a United States Bicentennial postage stamp that was released on March 25, 1975, which depicts her on a horse.

Early life, family and death

Ludington was born on April 5, 1761, in Fredericksburg, New York.  She was the first of 12 children of Abigail and Henry Ludington, a gristmill owner. According to his relatives, Sybil's father had fought in the French and Indian War, and volunteered to head the local militia during the Revolutionary War.

At the age of 23, in 1784 Ludington married Edmond Ogden. They had a son named Henry in 1786. In 1792, the family settled in Catskill, and Ogden died in 1799.  In 1811 Ludington moved to Unadilla, New York.

Ludington lived in Unadilla until her death on February 26, 1839, at the age of 77. She was buried near her father in the Patterson Presbyterian Cemetery in Patterson, New York. Her tombstone shows a different spelling of her first name.

Ludington's ride

Modern accounts recognize Ludington as a heroine of the American Revolutionary War.

Historical accounts 

Accounts originating from the Ludington family say Sybil played an important role during the British raid on  Danbury. 

According to the story told decades later, on April 26, 1777, then 16-year-old Sybil Ludington rode  from her hometown in Fredericksburg, New York (near Danbury, Connecticut) through Putnam County, New York, to rally approximately 400 militiamen under the command of her father, Colonel Henry Ludington, as British troops were burning Danbury, where the Continental Army had a supply depot. Troops from New York and Connecticut rallied to engage the British the next day in the Battle of Ridgefield, and the British retreated.

A brief mention of Ludington's ride was published by his grandchildren in 1907 as part of Ludington's father's memoirs. Modern accounts say Ludington was congratulated for her heroism by General George Washington; more recent scholarship has raised doubt that the ride even took place.

Research history 

A 2022 Smithsonian magazine article written by Abigail Tucker states that the earliest known record of the 1777 account of Ludington's ride came in 1854 from Sybil's nephew, Charles H. Ludington, who sought to have his aunt recognized as a hero. Ludington was included in an 1880 book about the New York City area by local historian Martha Lamb. A brief later reference appeared in the 1907 memoirs written by Willis Fletcher Johnson about Sybil's father and published privately by his grandchildren.  

Tucker states that letters written by Ludington herself do not mention the ride. Accounts vary as to whether she rode bareback or sidesaddle, what the name of the horse was, and how her name was spelled (Sybil, Cybal, Sibyl, Sebil, Sybille, or Sibbell). 

In 1838, Ludington asked for a pension based on her husband, Ogden, having fought in the Revolutionary War, but she could not prove that she was married to him. According to Paula Hunt, writing in The New England Quarterly journal, "None of the sworn affidavits attesting to Henry Ogden’s military service and the legitimacy of Sybil's marriage mentioned her ride, nor did she attempt to claim it as justification for a pension." 

Lamb stated that her account relied on sources including letters, sermons, genealogical compilations, wills, and court records to document details. She cites no sources, nor provides documentation of the ride. Hunt suggests the account may have been told to Lamb by Ludington's descendants.

Owing partly to a lack of contemporary accounts, Hunt raises questions about the events. She writes that neither of the original publications about the ride "had offered any information about Sybil's course", and the purported route was devised speculatively by the project managers who later installed historic markers, a "relatively inexpensive but increasingly popular means for states and localities to promote tourism".  The installation of the historic roadside markers beginning in 1934 – although based on speculative locations according to Hunt – led to publications that propelled Sybil to the status of a heroine by 1937, and the publication of a 1940 poem about her brought the story to a national audience.  Doubts about the story had been raised as early as 1956; contrasting it to the Betsy Ross story, Hunt cites Henry Noble McCracken's, Old Dutchess Forever! The Story of an American County and two New York news articles from 1995, writing that:In Sybil's case, the state-sanctified historical roadside markers, statue, and postage stamp celebrating her ride, and the many books and newspaper and magazine articles that retold her story, had created an aura of authority that effectively dispelled any intermittent bouts of skepticism.

Hunt has provided a history of how the Ludington story has been portrayed in the media and literature, and in efforts to promote tourism. Pollak wrote in 1975 in the New York Times that "Many children's books treat the account as historical fact", although the Putnam County Historian indicated there was "no solid evidence that Sybil actually made the ride". Hunt states that many popular details were fiction, such as the horse named Star, the stick she held, and the distance of 40 miles. Hunt states that the two accounts of Ludington's ride were not mentioned in any other significant history produced in the same era, and that even as stories of heroic women of the colonial era proliferated by the 1870s, the only published accounts of Ludington were Lamb's and Johnson's. She writes:
  
Sybil's ride embraces the mythical meanings and values expressed in the country's founding. As an individual, she represents Americans' persistent need to find and create heroes who embody prevalent attitudes and beliefs.

Contemporaneous sources suggest that the patriot army – and the town of Danbury, Connecticut – were already aware of the approaching British troops, as noted in The New-York Gazette and the Weekly Mercury, May 19, 1777, which stated: On Saturday, the 26th of April, express came to Danbury from Brigadier General Silliman, advising that a large body of enemy had landed the day before at sun set, at Compo, a point of land between Fairfield and Norwalk, and were marching toward Danbury. Measures were immediately taken.

In 1996, the national Daughters of the American Revolution (DAR) said that the evidence was not strong enough to support their criteria for a war heroine, and added a note to an exhibition saying of the ride, "It's a great story, but there is no way to know whether or not it is true." The DAR chapter near her historic home says that her exploit was documented, and it continues to honor her.

Hunt concludes, "The story of the lone, teenage girl riding for freedom, it seems, is simply too good not to be believed."

Legacy and honors

In 1934, New York State began to install a number of historic markers along Ludington's purported route. 

A commemorative sculpture by Anna Hyatt Huntington was erected at Lake Gleneida near Carmel, New York, in 1961. Smaller versions of the statue are at the Daughters of the American Revolution headquarters in Washington, D.C., the public library in Danbury, Connecticut, and at Brookgreen Gardens, Murrells Inlet, South Carolina. 

In 1975, Ludington was honored with a postage stamp in the "Contributors to the Cause" United States Bicentennial series. The National Rifle Association instituted the Sybil Ludington Women's Freedom Award in 1995.

Composer Ludmila Ulehla wrote the 1993 chamber opera Sybil of the American Revolution based on the story of Ludington's ride. In 2014, Ludington was featured on the American Heroes Channel documentary American Revolution: Patriots Rising. The movie Sybil Ludington, The female Paul Revere was produced in 2010.

See also
 Betsy Ross – credited by relatives with making the first US flag; accounts dismissed by historians
 Laura Secord, heroine of War of 1812
 Women in the American Revolution

Notes

References

Sources 

 
  
 
 

1761 births
1839 deaths
Women in the American Revolution
People of the Province of New York
People of New York (state) in the American Revolution
People from Dutchess County, New York
People from Kent, New York
Ludington family
People from Catskill, New York